Founded by Bob Mair in 1991, Black Toast Music is an independent music publisher/production music library located in Los Angeles, CA. Since its launch, the company has placed music in television series (including “True Blood,” “Dexter,” “Treme,” and “The Wire,” and others), motion pictures (including “Arthur” with Russell Brand, “When In Rome” with Kristen Bell, “I Love You, Phillip Morris” with Jim Carrey, “Dead Silence,” “Jiminy Glick in Lalawood,” and others). Black Toast Music has also licensed its artists’ music to a variety videogames, national advertising campaigns, internet advertising campaigns, as well as, numerous multi-media presentations.

Notable Clients 
NBCUniversal (NBC, E! Entertainment)
ViacomCBS (CBS, BET, MTV, Paramount Pictures, Comedy Central)
Disney (ABC, FX, Disney, Lifetime Television)
WarnerMedia (Warner Bros., CW, HBO)
Fox Corporation (Fox)
SONY
Konami
Activision

External links 
 Official Site

Production music